The 1989 Soviet Second League was the Soviet third tier competitions of the Soviet football championship. The competitions of the league were conducted as part of the whole Soviet event and were split in nine groups geographically as regional zones. There were 169 teams that completed the season with the most teams (26) competing in the Zone VI and smallest zones IV and IX having 16 teams. In the article a regional designation in parenthesis is conditional (for better perspective) and was never actually openly publicized.

The competitions were composed of two stages starting with nine zonal groups, nine winners of which would qualify for three group promotional double round-robin tournaments (Zone Finals), three winners of those would actually gain their promotions. The "Zone Finals" took place on October 25 through November 12, 1988. 

The main tie-breaker on points tie was number of wins, therefore in the Zone II Metallurg Magnitogorsk placed 8th above Lokomotiv Gorkiy and Dinamo Kirov. In case of points tie occurring for the first place, a separate play-off was to be scheduled.

Zonal tournament

Zone I (Central)

Zone II (Volga/Ural)

Zone III (South)

Match for 1st place 
 Cement Novorossiysk  2-0 Torpedo Taganrog

Zone IV (Far East)

Zone V (Soviet Republics)

Zone VI (Ukraine)

Zone VII (Central Asia)

Zone VIII (Kazakhstan)

Zone IX (Caucasus)

Zone Finals

Group 1

Group 2

Group 3

References
 All-Soviet Archive Site
 Results. RSSSF

Soviet Second League seasons
3
Soviet
Soviet